The London and North Eastern Railway (LNER) produced several classes of locomotive, mostly to the designs of Nigel Gresley, characterised by a three-cylinder layout with a parallel boiler and round-topped firebox.  It produced the most famous locomotive of its day, 4468 'Mallard', the holder of the world steam locomotive speed record. It also built the world-famous 4472 'Flying Scotsman'. However, its locomotive inheritance was much greater than just the 'A4 Class', it also produced highly successful mixed-traffic and freight designs.

 For an explanation of the classification and numbering systems used by the LNER and its constituent companies, see: LNER locomotive numbering and classification.

Locomotives of constituent companies

Great Central Railway
Including the Manchester, Sheffield and Lincolnshire Railway

Richard Peacock (1846–1854)

W. G. Craig (1854–1859)

Charles Sacré (1859–1886)

Thomas Parker (1886–1893)

Harry Pollitt (1893–1900)

John G. Robinson (1900–22)
see John G. Robinson

There were also 3 steam rail cars built in 1904–1905. These were withdrawn in 1914.

Lancashire, Derbyshire and East Coast Railway
The Lancashire, Derbyshire and East Coast Railway was absorbed by the Great Central Railway on 1 January 1907. All LD&ECR locomotives were built by Kitson & Co.

Great Eastern Railway

Great North of Scotland Railway

In 1923 the Great North of Scotland Railway passed on a total of 122 locomotives, 100 4-4-0 tender locomotives and 22 tank engines, all capable of being used on either passenger or goods trains, to the LNER.

Great Northern Railway

Hull and Barnsley Railway

From its formal establishment in 1885 to the time that it was taken over by the North Eastern Railway (NER) in 1922, the CME of the H&BR was Matthew Stirling, who, like his father and uncle, built locomotives with domeless boilers.

Metropolitan Railway

Three classes (the G, H and K Classes) were taken into LNER stock on 1 November 1937. The other former Metropolitan locomotives were retained by London Transport, which had acquired all of them at its formation on 1 July 1933.

Midland and Great Northern Joint Railway
M&GN locomotives were taken into LNER stock on 1 October 1936.

North British Railway

North Eastern Railway

Locomotives built by the LNER

Gresley designs

Thompson designs

Peppercorn designs

Another A1, "Tornado" has been built by subscription among LNER (and other) locomotive enthusiasts, and came into service in 2008. In total it cost £3 million. Again under the chairmanship of Mark Allatt, the team is (2014) now raising funds most successfully to build another Gresley P2 2-8-2 of the "Cock O'the North" Class, to be called "Prince of Wales". Both new steam locomotives are the product of a restored railway works in Darlington.

Other designs 
 LNER Class A1 – continuation of a GNR design. Several built under the GNR entered service under the LNER.
 LNER Class A2 – based on an NER design simply designated as 4.6.2
 LNER Class A5 – Continuation of a GCR design
 LNER Class A8 – rebuilt from H1 between 1931 and 1936
 LNER Class B12/3 – based on an existing GER design
 LNER Class B16 – continuation of an NER design
 LNER Class C9 – C7 rebuild
 LNER Class D16 – based on an existing GER design. Built by the GER but delivered after grouping.
 LNER Class J27 – continuation of an NER design
 LNER Class J45/DES1 English Electric diesel electric shunting locomotive
 LNER Class DES2 Brush diesel electric shunting locomotive
 LNER Class J50 – continuation of a GNR design. Thirty were rebuilds of Class J51.
 LNER Class J72 – NER Class E1
 LNER Class J94 – WD Austerity 0-6-0ST
 LNER Class N2 – continuation of a GNR design
 LNER Class N7 – continuation of a GER design
 LNER Class N15 – continuation of an NBR design
 LNER Class O6 – LMS Stanier Class 8F – 60 loaned to the LNER 1943–47; 68 purchased 1945–46, sold to LMS 1947  
 LNER Class O7 – WD Austerity 2-8-0 – 350 loaned to the LNER 1943–47; 200 purchased 1946; 270 loaned to the LNER 1947
 USATC S160 Class – 168 loaned to the LNER 1942–1945
 WD Austerity 2-10-0 – 13 loaned to the LNER 1943–44; 20 loaned 1945–46
 LNER Class S1 – Continuation of a GCR design
 LNER Class T1 – NER Class X
 LNER Class Y1 – Sentinel shunter
 LNER Class Y3 – Sentinel shunter
 LNER Class Y7 – NER Class H
 LNER Class Y10 – Sentinel shunter
 LNER Class Y11 – Simplex 0-4-0 petrol locomotive (later British Rail 15097–15099)

Post-Nationalisation
British Railways continued to build LNER designs (the B1 and L1 classes in particular) immediately after Nationalisation. Remarkably, it even built a new series of shunting locomotives (J72 class) to a pre-Grouping design (of the North Eastern Railway). However, it was to be the Eastern Region that took the first of BR's new Standard locomotives, 70000 'Britannia', for its Great Eastern Main Line workings to Norwich in 1951.

BR built 396 locomotives to ex-LNER designs.  One of these, the J72 Class was a North Eastern Railway design dating from 1898.

Withdrawal
Withdrawal of ex-LNER locomotives took place throughout the 1960s, with some of the once high-profile 'A4 Class' locomotives ending their lives on heavy freight trains in Scotland; a far cry from the glamorous express workings of the late 1930s.

Preservation
Several of the many LNER locomotives have been preserved. (Numbers given are those currently carried: many locomotives have carried a range of numbers during their active and preserved careers).

† denotes name given only in preservation.

See also
 List of LNER locomotives as of 31 December 1947

References

Footnotes

Sources

External links

Locomotives of the LNER

 
British railway-related lists
London and North Eastern Railway
London and North Eastern Railway